Behind the Door is a surviving 1919 silent war drama film produced by Thomas Ince, directed by Irvin Willat and distributed by Paramount Pictures. The picture is a starring vehicle for veteran actor Hobart Bosworth and the supporting cast features Jane Novak and Wallace Beery. The film's source is a short story by Gouverneur Morris, also titled "Behind the Door," published in McClure's Magazine in July 1917. The film is extant at the Library of Congress and the Gosfilmofond Russian State Archive. In 2016, the San Francisco Silent Film Festival, working with the Library of Congress and Godfilmofond, created a more fully-restored print of the film.

Plot
In 1925 (set six years after the film's release), the silhouetted figure of Oscar Krug, a seafarer, enters a graveyard above a town in coastal Maine. That morning in town, he enters the abandoned taxidermy shop he once owned.  He slumps at his former worktable and is lost in memory.  Except for the last scene, the rest of the film's story is an extended flashback.

In 1917, Krug, a German-American taxidermist who had been a sailor in the U.S. Navy is subject to suspicion and resentment by the townspeople.  He nonetheless wins the heart of Alice Morse, despite the disapproval of her father, the town banker.  When news arrives of the U.S. declaration of war against Germany, the townspeople question Krug's patriotism, even though he was already on the way to enlist.  A mass fistfight ensues, with the group's leader, Bill Tavish, finally accepting Krug's devotion to his country.  The two men rush off to enlist in the Navy.  Krug and Alice are married in secret soon after.

Alice is thrown out by her father when he learns of the marriage, and she manages to stow away on the Navy ship that Krug now commands.  The ship's nurse takes her on as an assistant before she reveals her presence to Krug.  Krug's ship is sunk by a German U-boat, commanded by Lt. Brandt, who then abducts Alice from the lifeboat that she and Krug shared, with Krug vowing revenge.

Now in command of a new ship, Krug is still haunted by his hatred.  His ship sinks a U-boat that turns out to have been commanded by Brandt. To his crew's bewilderment, Krug welcomes Brandt to his cabin, speaking German and getting him drunk.  Not knowing Krug's identity, Brandt brags about how Alice was sexually abused and died.  Krug then reveals himself and binds Brandt behind a closet door.  When Krug's first officers enter the cabin, they are horrified to discover that Krug, with his taxidermy tools, had skinned Brandt alive.

In the final scene, set again in the film's present, Krug collapses at his worktable and dies.  His spirit is greeted by that of Alice, and the two are united again in death.

Cast
Hobart Bosworth as Oscar Krug
Jane Novak as Alice Morse
Wallace Beery as Lieutenant Brandt
James Gordon as Bill Tavish
Dick Wain as McQuestion (credited as Richard Wain/or Wayne)
J. P. Lockney as Matthew Morse
Gibson Gowland as Gideon Blank
Otto Hoffman as Mark Arnold
Tom Ashton as Fishing Boy

Home media release
Flicker Alley has released a Blu-ray/DVD restored edition on April 4, 2017.

References

External links

Behind the Door at Turner Classic Movies
Excerpts from interview of Irvin Willat, director of Behind the Door, by Bob Birchard
Sarah Bastan, audio excerpts for Behind the Door, Inside the Library of Congress: An Interview with Mike Mashon
Marc Wanamaker, "The History behind Behind the Door (1919)" at Flicker Alley

1919 films
American silent feature films
Films based on short fiction
Paramount Pictures films
Films directed by Irvin Willat
American black-and-white films
1910s war drama films
American war drama films
1919 drama films
1910s American films
Silent American drama films
Silent war drama films
1910s English-language films